Chris Dinkins is an American politician. She is a member of the Missouri House of Representatives, having served since 2018. She is a member of the Republican party.

References

Living people
Republican Party members of the Missouri House of Representatives
21st-century American politicians
Year of birth missing (living people)
Women state legislators in Missouri
21st-century American women politicians